Kaleo Scott Moylan (born October 29, 1966) is a Guamanian politician and businessman who served as the 7th Lieutenant Governor of Guam from January 6, 2003 to January 1, 2007. He is a member of the Republican Party of Guam.

Biography
1984 George Washington High School, Mangilao, Guam graduate. Where he played for their football team. Before 2003, Moylan was a senator in the Guam Legislature. A member of the Republican Party, he is the son of the first elected Lieutenant Governor, Kurt Moylan, a founding member of the Republican Party of Guam, and the grandson of the businessman, Scotty Moylan. Outside politics, he has held various positions in the Moylan family's businesses including Moylan's Insurance Underwriters, Inc.

Moylan-Santos campaign (2006)
Moylan declared his candidacy for the 2006 gubernatorial election and was a candidate in the September 2006 Republican primary. His running mate for Lt. Governor was Democratic Senator Francis E. Santos. The Moylan-Santos team faced the incumbent governor Felix Perez Camacho and Senator Dr. Michael Cruz. He defeated his main Republican rival, for the Moylan-Santos team in the primary election on September 2, 2006, when their taking over Camacho-Cruz team.

See also 
 List of minority governors and lieutenant governors in the United States

References 

1966 births
Guamanian people of Chinese descent
Guamanian people of Irish descent
Guamanian people of Native Hawaiian descent
Guamanian people of Polish descent
Guamanian Republicans
Lieutenant Governors of Guam
Living people
Members of the Legislature of Guam